Maratus nigromaculatus is a species of the genus Maratus (peacock spiders), an Australian member of the jumping spider family. Described in 1883 by Keyserling as Ergane nigromaculata from a specimen from Rockhampton, they are found in Queensland. The species name is derived from the Latin words niger "black" and maculatus "spotted".

References

Salticidae
Spiders of Australia
Spiders described in 1883